The 2013–14 West Bank Premier League was the 11th season of the top-level football league in the West Bank, Palestine. It began on 10 September 2013 and ended on 29 March 2014. Shabab Al-Dhahiriya were the defending champions.

League table

Results

West Bank Premier League seasons
1
West